Justin Smith (born March 1, 1999) is an American professional basketball player for Delaware Blue Coats of the NBA G League. He played college basketball for the Indiana Hoosiers and the Arkansas Razorbacks.

High school career

Smith attended Stevenson High School in Lincolnshire, Illinois. In his sophomore season, he played alongside Jalen Brunson and won the 2015 IHSA Class 4A state title. As a senior, Smith averaged 21.7 points and 10 rebounds per game. A consensus four-star recruit, he committed to playing college basketball for Indiana over offers from Villanova, Stanford, Wisconsin and Xavier.

College career
As a freshman at Indiana, Smith averaged 6.5 points and 3.2 rebounds per game. On March 2, 2019, he scored a sophomore season-high 24 points in a 63–62 upset win over sixth-ranked Michigan State. Smith averaged 8.2 points and 4.5 rebounds per game as a sophomore, his first year in a starting role. In his junior season, he averaged 10.4 points and 5.2 rebounds per game, before leaving the program. Smith moved to Arkansas as a graduate transfer. On December 20, 2020, he recorded 22 points and 17 rebounds in an 87–76 victory over Oral Roberts. Smith missed four games with an ankle injury that required surgery. As a senior, he averaged 13.6 points and 7.3 rebounds per game, helping lead the Razorbacks to a 25–7 record and a berth in the Elite Eight of the NCAA Tournament. Following the season, Smith declared for the 2021 NBA draft.

Professional career

Raptors 905 (2021–2022)
On December 31, 2021, Smith was acquired via waivers by the Raptors 905 of the NBA G League. He was waived on February 7, 2022. On February 10, 2022, Smith was reacquired and activated by the Raptors 905.

Delaware Blue Coats (2022–present)
On November 4, 2022, Smith was named to the opening night roster for the Delaware Blue Coats.

Career statistics

College

|-
| style="text-align:left;"| 2017–18
| style="text-align:left;"| Indiana
| 31 || 9 || 14.9 || .550 || .300 || .673 || 3.2 || .2 || .2 || .3 || 6.5
|-
| style="text-align:left;"| 2018–19
| style="text-align:left;"| Indiana
| 35 || 32 || 24.8 || .496 || .219 || .514 || 4.5 || .8 || .6 || .4 || 8.2
|-
| style="text-align:left;"| 2019–20
| style="text-align:left;"| Indiana
| 32 || 32 || 30.4 || .492 || .263 || .673 || 5.2 || .9 || 1.0 || .3 || 10.4
|-
| style="text-align:left;"| 2020–21
| style="text-align:left;"| Arkansas
| 28 || 28 || 32.0 || .545 || .217 || .630 || 7.3 || 1.8 || 1.2 || .6 || 13.6
|- class="sortbottom"
| style="text-align:center;" colspan="2"| Career
| 126 || 101 || 25.4 || .519 || .243 || .625 || 4.9 || .9 || .7 || .4 || 9.5

References

External links
Arkansas Razorbacks bio
Indiana Hoosiers bio

1999 births
Living people
American expatriate basketball people in Canada
American men's basketball players
Arkansas Razorbacks men's basketball players
Basketball players from Illinois
Indiana Hoosiers men's basketball players
People from Highland Park, Illinois
Raptors 905 players
Small forwards